The Nestorian pillar of Luoyang is a Tang Chinese pillar erected in 814–815 CE, which contains inscriptions related  to early Christianity in China, particularly the Church of the East. It is a Nestorian pillar, discovered in 2006 in Luoyang, which is related to the Xi'an Stele.

The pillar
The title of the pillar is  "Sutra on the Origin of Origins of Daqin Luminous Religion", one of the Jingjiao Documents. The pillar was erected in 814-815 CE, and moved to another location in 829 CE, as explained in one part of the inscriptions. The "sutra" which starts with a Trisagion (Qadishā Alāhā) was dedicated to a deceased Lady An of Sogdian descent. The inscription tells about her ancestors who came from Bukhara in Central Asia; her relatives and clergymen from the Luoyang Daqin Monastery, who attended the funeral service also had typical Sogdian surnames such as Mi (origin of Maymurgh) and Kang (of Samarkand, or historically Kangju).

See also

Church of the East in China  
Jingjiao Documents
Adam (Jingjing)
Painting of a Christian figure
Murals from the Christian temple at Qocho
 Sogdian Daēnās

References

Further reading
 . Originally published by: Hutchinson & Co, London, 1924.

External links
 SIR E. A. WALLIS BUDGE, KT.,  THE MONKS OF KUBLAl KHAN EMPEROR OF CHINA (1928) - contains reproductions of early photographs of the stele where it stood in the early 20th century (from Havret etc.)

8th-century inscriptions
Monuments and memorials in China
Church of the East in China
Chinese steles
Luoyang
8th-century Christian texts
Nestorian texts
Sogdians